Stigmella fulva is a moth of the family Nepticulidae. It is found in New Zealand.

The length of the forewings is 4–5 mm. Adults have been recorded from January to March and from August to December. Reared specimens emerged in May and July. There are apparently continuous generations throughout the year.

The larvae feed on Olearia species, such as Olearia arborescens, Olearia ilicifolia, Olearia nitida  and Olearia macrodonta. It is most common on Olearia arborescens. They mine the leaves of their host plant. The mine starts as a very narrow gallery in the lower surface of the leaf, but soon expands into a blotch. The small starting point is often included in the blotch and only recognisable by purple discolouration in the leaf around egg site. The mines often difficult to see, owing to the position in the lower mesophyll layer of the leaf. Larva have been recorded in all months except January, February and June. They are 4–5 mm long and pale yellow.

The cocoon is brown and spun in the ground.

References

External links
Fauna of New Zealand - Number 16: Nepticulidae (Insecta: Lepidoptera)

Nepticulidae
Moths of New Zealand
Moths described in 1921
Endemic fauna of New Zealand
Endemic moths of New Zealand